Phragmatiphila is a genus of moths of the family Noctuidae.

Species
 Phragmatiphila agrapta Wileman & West, 1929
 Phragmatiphila connexa Bethune-Baker, 1911
 Phragmatiphila hemicelaena Wileman & West, 1929
 Phragmatiphila nexa (Hübner, [1808])

References
Natural History Museum Lepidoptera genus database
Phragmatiphila at funet

Hadeninae